Tikattane is a coastal town in western Mauritania. It is located in Akjoujt department in the Inchiri Region

Nearby towns and villages include El Mamghar (25.6 nm), Regbet Thila (26.5 nm), Iouik (50.1 nm), Akjoujt (113.2 nm), Portendick (27.8 nm) and Tanit (27.1 nm).

Populated places in Mauritania
Populated coastal places in Mauritania
Inchiri Region